A list of strategic bombing over Germany in World War II includes cities and towns in Germany attacked by RAF Bomber Command and the Eighth Air Force. This list not complete.

History

Defence of Germany
German defensive strategy of their country, and neighbouring occupied countries, against strategic bombing was conducted by the Defence of the Reich.

In February 1944, the RAF and USAAF air raids of Big Week notably limited the offensive capability of the Luftwaffe, from which it would never recover. On the first day of Big Week, 127 German fighters were shot down for the loss of one P-51 Mustang fighter. 434 German fighter pilots were killed in February 1944, which was 17% of the total, and many were the more-experienced fighter pilots. 

The German air defence had advanced radar and was often impenetrable, or only penetrable at great cost; only aircraft such as the de Havilland Mosquito could completely outwit the German defences; the Mosquito was almost impossible to shoot down, being able to outrun most German fighter aircraft too, and it carried no discernible defensive armament. Around fifteen German cities were firebombed, in which destruction of the cities was almost total; the temperatures created in the firestorm were huge. Many north-western German cities were bombed in late 1943 in the Battle of the Ruhr.

Destruction
Approximately 410,000 German civilians were killed in the strategic bombing.  Within the 1937 borders of Germany, industrial capacity was greater at the end of the war than at the beginning. British and American raids often deliberately targeted the highly flammable medieval and early modern city centres, which had no military value. The raids intensified in the final months of the war, when Germany’s defeat was effectively inevitable.

Strategic bombing

B
 Bombing of Braunschweig (October 1944); the main raid was on 14/15 October 1944 by No. 5 Group RAF and part of the 24-hour Operation Hurricane, where around 10,000 tons were dropped.

D
 Bombing of Darmstadt in World War II; the raid on 11/12 September 1944 resulted in a firestorm
 Bombing of Dresden in World War II
 Bombing of Duisburg in World War II

E
 Bombing of Essen in World War II

H

 Bombing of Hamburg in World War II

 Bombings of Heilbronn in World War II

K
 Bombing of Kassel in World War II; on the raid on 22 October 1943, Operation Corona was first implemented, whereby native German speakers would give confusing orders to the Luftwaffe fighter pilots from Hollywood Manor at West Kingsdown, Kent; the raid resulted in a firestorm, destroying 23 square miles; the Kassel Mission by the USAAF occurred on 27 September 1944, and was one of the largest air battles between the Luftwaffe and the USAAF, and 118 American aircrew were killed, of which 11 were murdered after parachuting to safety
 Bombing of Konigsberg

M
 Bombing of Munich in World War II; the main raid was on 24/25 April 1944

S
 Bombing of Stuttgart in World War II

W
 Bombing of Wuppertal in World War II; the raid on 29–30 May 1943 caused a firestorm

See also
 :Category:World War II strategic bombing units
 List of strategic bombing over the United Kingdom in World War II
 Civilian casualties of strategic bombing
 List of air operations during the Battle of Europe
 Lists of World War II topics

References

External links
 War History Online

Bombing
History of the Royal Air Force
United States Army Air Forces
Germany
World War II strategic bombing of Germany